The 1981–82 Iraq FA Cup was the sixth edition of the Iraq FA Cup as a clubs-only competition. The tournament was won by Al-Zawraa for the fourth time, beating 1981–82 Iraqi National League champions Al-Talaba 2–1 in the final. Al-Zawraa qualified for the final by beating Al-Quwa Al-Jawiya 2–1 in the semi-final with goals from Thamir Yousef and Ahmed Radhi. The biggest win in the tournament was Al-Talaba's 8–0 win over Salahaddin in Tikrit on 2 June.

Matches

Final

References

External links
 Iraqi Football Website

Iraq FA Cup
Cup